Clayton Daniel Bellinger (born November 18, 1968) is a former Major League Baseball player. He played in MLB for the New York Yankees and the Anaheim Angels, winning the World Series twice as a member of the Yankees.

His son, Cody, was the 2019 National League MVP and won the 2020 World Series.

Early life
A native of Oneonta, New York, Bellinger played shortstop for Rollins College in Winter Park, Florida.

Career
Bellinger was drafted by the San Francisco Giants in the second round (44th overall pick) in the 1989 draft. His first 10 seasons of professional baseball were spent in the minor leagues, six in Triple-A. Before his first call-up as a 30-year-old in 1999, he played more than 1,000 minor league games. He played every position (including designated hitter) except for catcher and pitcher.

In the ninth inning of Game 2 of the 2000 World Series, Bellinger was inserted in left field in place of David Justice. Bellinger scaled the wall to rob the Mets' Todd Zeile of a two-run home run and preserve a victory for the Yankees. The Yankees released him when he became eligible for arbitration; Bellinger then signed with the Anaheim Angels.

International career
While playing in the Baltimore Orioles system in 2004, he was recruited by owner Peter Angelos to play for the Greek baseball team in the 2004 Summer Olympics held in Athens. Bellinger has Greek grandparents, and Angelos was in charge of the Greek national baseball team. In order to field a competitive team in the Olympics, Angelos made the decision to use experienced American players with mostly distant Greek ancestry (players' ancestry eligibility was allowed to date as far back as great-grandparents), as opposed to native Greeks due to their inexperience in a country where baseball was almost never played. Bellinger agreed as he hoped it would earn him a September call-up to the Orioles' roster when the Olympics were over. The Greek team went 1–6 and failed to advance to the medal round. Bellinger was one of a handful of players on the roster with Major League experience, and the only player to have won a World Series ring. He was not promoted to the Orioles' roster after the games concluded.

After baseball 
Bellinger was the assistant coach of the Chandler, Arizona, Little League All-Stars, who advanced to the 2007 Little League World Series.

As of 2017, Bellinger has been working for several years as a firefighter in Gilbert, Arizona.

Personal life
Bellinger and his wife Jennifer have  a daughter and two sons: Ashli, Cody, who plays for the Chicago Cubs, and Cole, who was drafted by the San Diego Padres in 2017. Clay pitched to Cody in the 2017 Home Run Derby.

References

External links

Baseball players from New York (state)
1968 births
Living people
Major League Baseball infielders
New York Yankees players
Anaheim Angels players
People from Oneonta, New York
American people of Greek descent
Olympic baseball players of Greece
Greek baseball players
Baseball players at the 2004 Summer Olympics
Rollins Tars baseball players
American firefighters
Clinton Giants players
Columbus Clippers players
Everett Giants players
Fresno Grizzlies players
Ottawa Lynx players
American expatriate baseball players in Canada
Phoenix Firebirds players
Rochester Red Wings players
Salt Lake Stingers players
San Jose Giants players
Shreveport Captains players